Timothy John Edward Tollemache, 5th Baron Tollemache  (born 13 December 1939) is an English peer and landowner. He is the eldest son of Major John Edward Hamilton Tollemache, 4th Baron Tollemache (1910–1975), and his wife, Dinah Jamieson. He succeeded his father as Baron Tollemache in 1975 and is the current owner of Helmingham Hall, the principal seat of the Tollemache family.

Education and career
Educated at Eton College, Tollemache served as Lord-Lieutenant of Suffolk from 2003 to 2014. Previously, he was Vice-Lieutenant of Suffolk from 1994 to 2003 and had been Deputy Lieutenant from 1984 to 1994. He is the patron or president of several organizations and societies.

Tollemache was appointed Knight Commander of the Royal Victorian Order (KCVO) in the 2015 New Year Honours.

Marriage and family
Tollemache married Alexandra Dorothy Jean Meynell (or Maynell) in 1970. Lady Tollemache is a garden designer, working under the name Xa Tollemache. She supervises the gardens at Helmingham and has also worked on the Millennium Garden at Castle Hill in Devon, Dunbeath Castle in Scotland, and the Cloister Garden at Wilton House.

Lord and Lady Tollemache have the following issue:
The Hon. Selina Karen Tollemache (born 3 October 1973) married James Hopkins on 11 September 2010. They have one daughter, Lily Alexandra Hopkins (2 April 2012). 
The Hon. Edward John Hugh Tollemache (born 12 May 1976), a godson of King Charles III, married Sophie Johnstone on 3 February 2007. They have three children. 
The Hon. James Henry Timothy Tollemache (born 28 August 1980) married  Princess Florence of Prussia (born 1983), daughter of Prince Frederick Nicholas of Prussia, on 10 May 2014. They have one daughter, Sylvie Beatrice Selina Tollemache (2 March 2016)

Lord and Lady Tollemache are members of the Countryside Alliance and have opened their gardens to the public, although their house remains private. A portrait of Lady Tollemache by Tessa Traegar, commissioned in 2004, hangs in the National Portrait Gallery collections.

Honours
  KCVO – appointed 2015.
  KStJ – appointed 2004.

Coat of arms

See also
 Peckforton Castle
 Tollemache baronets
 Tollemache Brewery

Footnotes

External links
 Profile, burkespeerage.com; accessed 2 June 2016.

1939 births
Living people
British people of Scottish descent
People from Mid Suffolk District
Barons in the Peerage of the United Kingdom
People educated at Eton College
Lord-Lieutenants of Suffolk
Knights of Justice of the Order of St John
Knights Commander of the Royal Victorian Order
Timothy John Edward Tollemache, 5th Baron Tollemache

Tollemache